Jalda is a census town in Sundargarh district in the Indian state of Odisha.

Demographics
 India census, Jalda had a population of 11,957. Males constitute 51% of the population and females 49%. Jalda has an average literacy rate of 63%, higher than the national average of 59.5%: male literacy is 73%, and female literacy is 52%. In Jalda, 12% of the population is under 6 years of age.
Jalda is divided into Jalda A Block, Jalda B Block and Jalda C Block.

References

Cities and towns in Sundergarh district